Mara Provincial Park is a provincial park in Ramara, Ontario, Canada. It is situated on the northern shore of Lake Simcoe, and provides camping, boating, swimming and other recreational activities.

References

External links

 

Provincial parks of Ontario
Parks in Simcoe County
Protected areas established in 1970
1970 establishments in Ontario